El Salvador competed at the 2000 Summer Olympics in Sydney, Australia, from 15 September to 1 October 2000. This was the nation's seventh appearance at the Olympics.

Comité Olímpico de El Salvador sent a total of 8 athletes to the Games, 4 men and 4 women, to compete in 7 sports. Weightlifter Eva Dimas was chosen to carry her nation's flag during the opening ceremony.

Competitors 
Comité Olímpico de El Salvador selected a team of 8 athletes, 4 men and 4 women, to compete in 7 sports. Cyclist Maureen Kaila, at age 35, was the oldest athlete of the team, while pistol shooter Luisa Maida was the youngest at age 20.

The following is the list of number of competitors participating in the Games.

Archery

Men
In El Salvadors's debut archery competition, the nation entered only one man. He lost his first match.

Athletics

Men
Track & road events

Women
Track & road events

Cycling

Track

Women

Judo

Men

Shooting

Women

Swimming

Men

Weightlifting

Women

See also
El Salvador at the 1999 Pan American Games

References
General
Wallechinsky, David (2004). The Complete Book of the Summer Olympics (Athens 2004 Edition). Toronto, Canada. . 
International Olympic Committee (2001). The Results. Retrieved 12 November 2005.
Sydney Organising Committee for the Olympic Games (2001). Official Report of the XXVII Olympiad Volume 1: Preparing for the Games. Retrieved 20 November 2005.
Sydney Organising Committee for the Olympic Games (2001). Official Report of the XXVII Olympiad Volume 2: Celebrating the Games. Retrieved 20 November 2005.
Sydney Organising Committee for the Olympic Games (2001). The Results. Retrieved 20 November 2005.
Specific

Nations at the 2000 Summer Olympics
2000
2000 in Salvadoran sport